Melchiori is a surname. Notable people with the surname include:

Gerolamo Melchiori (died 1583), Italian Roman Catholic prelate 
Giorgio Melchiori (1920–2009), Italian literary critic and translator
Julian Melchiori (born 1991), Canadian ice hockey player
Mario Melchiori, Italian rower